German rapper Capital Bra has released eight studio albums, four extended plays (EPs) and seventy singles (including thirteen as featured artist). In 2016, he premiered his first studio album Kuku Bra which debuted at number 32 on the German and at number 61 on the Austrian album charts. In February 2017, Capital Bra released his second studio album Makarov Komplex which peaked within the top five in Austria, Germany and in Switzerland, spawning four singles of which "Es geht ums Geschäft" entered the charts at number 76 in Germany. The limited box set of Makarov Komplex included his first EP Oh Kolleg. In May of the same year, he distributed his second EP Ibrakadabra to minor commercial success in Switzerland.

In June 2017, Capital Bra announced his third studio album Blyat, which was released three months later and debuted at number three in Germany and Austria, and at number five in Switzerland. The record spawned six singles, including "Nur noch Gucci" and "Olé olé" which were certified gold in Germany. Capital Bra's fourth album Berlin lebt followed in June 2018 and topped the charts in German-speaking Europe. A week prior, he split from his record label Team Kuku, because of differences in interests. Four singles were promoted to promote the record—"5 Songs in einer Nacht", "Neymar", "One Night Stand" and "Berlin lebt"—all of which reached number one in Germany and the top ten in Austria and Switzerland. In early July, he signed a record deal with ersguterjunge, the label of fellow German rapper Bushido. His first single released under ersguterjunge, "Melodien", became his fifth consecutive single to reach the pole position of the German charts. In August 2018 the single set the record for the most streams in Germany in one day and in one week.

The rapper's fifth studio album, Allein was announced in late August 2018 and was released on 2 November 2018, again debuting within the top five of German-speaking Europe. His fourth extended play and first project under ersguterjunge were made available in September 2018, as part of the boxset of Bushido's thirteenth studio album Mythos. Capital Bra's sixth studio album CB6 was released on 12 April 2019 and supported through five singles; four of which reached the pole position of the German charts.

Albums

Studio albums

Collaborative albums

Extended plays

Live albums

Singles

As lead artist

As featured artist

Other charted songs

Guest appearances

Notes

References

Discographies of German artists
Hip hop discographies